Borderline is the fourth studio album by American country music duo Brooks & Dunn. Released in 1996 on Arista Records, the album produced five singles on the Hot Country Songs charts for the duo: the Number One hit "My Maria" (a cover of a pop tune originally recorded by B. W. Stevenson), the #2 "I Am That Man", the #13 "Mama Don't Get Dressed Up for Nothing" (their first non-Top 10 single), another #1 in "A Man This Lonely", and finally "Why Would I Say Goodbye" at #8. Borderline was certified 2× Platinum by the RIAA.

The song "My Love Will Follow You" was originally recorded by Buddy Miller on his 1995 album Your Love and Other Lies. Borderline was nominated at 39th Grammy Awards for Best Country Album.

Track listing

Charts

Weekly charts

Year-end charts

Certifications

Personnel

Brooks & Dunn
Kix Brooks – lead vocals, background vocals
Ronnie Dunn – lead vocals, background vocals

Additional musicians
Bruce Bouton – pedal steel guitar, slide guitar
Dennis Burnside – piano, keyboards, Hammond B-3 organ
Mark Casstevens – acoustic guitar, hi-string guitar, mandolin
Rob Hajacos – fiddle, "assorted hoedown tools" 
David Hungate – bass guitar
Brent Mason – electric guitar
Michael Rhodes – bass guitar
Tom Roady – percussion
John Wesley Ryles – background vocals
Dennis Wilson – background vocals
Lonnie Wilson – drums, percussion
Glenn Worf – bass guitar

References

1996 albums
Brooks & Dunn albums
Arista Records albums
Albums produced by Don Cook